Universal Arts Center, formerly known as Little Angels Arts Center is a performance venue in Seoul, South Korea. Universal Ballet performs their ballets there.

References

External links
 

Buildings and structures in Gwangjin District
Music venues in Seoul